Songs From The Heart is an album by gospel singer Yolanda Adams. Songs included the single "Still I Rise," dedicated to Rosa Parks, and interpolated from a poem by Maya Angelou. This was Adams' final album for the Verity Records label before signing with Elektra Records and gaining mainstream fame with her follow-up album Mountain High... Valley Low.

Track listing 
 Only Believe 4:29
 Is Your All On The Altar 5:43
 Still I Rise 5:42
 Never Alone 3:25
 Jesus Medley: Jesus Is All, Oh How Jesus Loves You And Me, Oh How I Love Jesus 8:39
 God Will Take Care Of You 4:12
 Lord, I Want To Be A Christian 5:11
 Know Him 5:17
 Come To Me 4:53
 His Presence Is Here 4:50

Chart positions

External links
 

1998 albums
Yolanda Adams albums